The Bees, Wasps and Ants Recording Society (BWARS) is a British society dedicated to recording bees, wasps and ants.

The recording of these insects is most important to monitor the health of an ecosystem, and in the past, studies of British ants were carried out by such notable myrmecologists as Horace Donisthorpe and Sir John Lubbock.

See also
 List of bees of Great Britain
 List of wasps of Great Britain
 List of ants of Great Britain

References

External links
 BWARS website

British biology societies
Conservation in the United Kingdom
Entomological organizations